{{Infobox Radio Show
| show_name          = Chas and Dom 
| image              = 
| imagesize          = 
| caption            = 
| other_names        = Chas and Dom from 'The Chaser| format             = Satire
| runtime            = 
| country            = Australia
| language           = English
| home_station       = Triple M
| syndicates         = 
| television         = 
| presenter          = Dominic KnightChas Licciardello
| starring           =
| announcer          = 
| creator            = The Chaser
| writer             = 
| director           = 
| producer           = 
| executive_producer = 
| narrated           = 
| record_location    = 
| first_aired        = 2 January 2007
| last_aired         = 25 January 2007
| num_series         = 
| num_episodes       = 
| audio_format       = 
| opentheme          = 
| endtheme           = 
| website            = Official website
| podcast            = 
}}Chas and Dom from 'The Chaser'''''' was a summer drive-time radio program broadcast on the Triple M network. The program was hosted by Chas Licciardello and Dominic Knight from the Australian satirical comedy group The Chaser. Other members of The Chaser also contributed as guests on the show, which ran from 4-6pm on weekdays between 2 January 2007 and 25 January 2007.

See also

External links
 Chas and Dom on the Triple M website

The Chaser
Australian comedy radio programs